Spray Industrial Historic District is a national historic district located at Eden, Rockingham County, North Carolina. It encompasses 70 contributing buildings, 9 contributing structures, and 1 contributing object in an industrial section of the town of Eden.  It includes buildings associated with eight textile mill complexes, mill village housing, and seven commercial buildings.  Notable contributing resources include the Smith River Dam and Spray Power canal, Morehead Cotton Mill complex, "Superintendent's" House (c. 1810), Imperial Bank and Trust Company (1912), Leaksville Cotton Mills complex, Spray Mercantile Building, Spray Cotton Mills complex, Lily Mill complex, Nantucket Mills complex designed by R. C. Biberstein, American Warehouse Company complex, Rhode Island Mill complex, Phillips-Chatham House (c. 1910), and Spray Woolen Mill complex.

It was listed on the National Register of Historic Places in 1986. The main Spray Cotton Mill building was destroyed by fire in January 2023.

References

Historic districts on the National Register of Historic Places in North Carolina
Buildings and structures in Rockingham County, North Carolina
National Register of Historic Places in Rockingham County, North Carolina